Gustav-Adolf "Täve" Schur (born 23 February 1931) is a former East German cyclist. He was born in Heyrothsberge, Saxony. His sporting career began with SC DHfK Leipzig. He was the first German to win the amateur competition of the World Cycling Championships and the Peace Race. Between 1959 and 1990 Schur was a member of the Volkskammer, the East German parliament.

Life 

"Täve" Schur (a shortening of Gustav) grew up near Magdeburg. He only took up cycling aged 19 and won the highest honors an amateur cyclist could reach. Schur won the East German championships 6 times in that period and won the GDR tour 4 times. In 1953 he had a great stake in East Germany winning the blue jersey of the best team at the Peace Race. His real breakthrough came in 1955, however, when he was the first East German to win the Peace Race, considered the most prestigious amateur stage race. Schur won the Peace Race once more in 1959.

As a member of the United Team of Germany he won a bronze medal in the team time trial at the 1956 Summer Olympics in Melbourne and a silver medal at the 1960 Summer Olympics in Rome, at a time when the impact East Germany would have in later Olympic Games was not foreseen yet. Between 1955 and 1963 Schur studied at the DHfK Leipzig and finished with a diploma as coach. In late 1950s Schur was at the height of his form, as proven by his two wins at the amateur road race at the road world championships in 1958 and 1959, he was the first amateur to defend his title.

Schur reached the summit of his popularity by not winning, however: At the 1960 UCI Road World Championships that took place at the Sachsenring, Schur was favorite to defend his title again, but instead he let his teammate Bernhard Eckstein pass who eventually won the race. This selfless gesture capped Schur's myth, the dimensions of which can be sensed if one considers the results of a survey conducted after the end of East Germany: here Schur was voted greatest East German sports personality of all time, 25 years after ending his career. Schur was selected as East-German Sportspersonality of the Year nine times in a row from 1953 to 1961. His son Jan (born 1962) won an Olympic gold medal in the team trial at the 1988 Summer Olympics, together with Uwe Ampler, Mario Kummer and Maik Landsmann.

Schur was more deeply involved politically than other sports people in East Germany. Between 1959 and 1990 he was a member of the Volkskammer. After German reunification he kept to his views and joined the SED successor party PDS and was a member of Germany's parliament, Bundestag, between 1998 and 2002.

Schur is also a member of the "Kuratorium Friedensfahrt Course de la Paix e.V.". In 1992 Schur opened a bicycle store in Magdeburg that is now run by his other son Gus-Erik Schur. "Täves Radladen" supports the bicycle racing club "RC Lostau" and takes part in races all over Europe under the name "Team Täves Radladen". In May 2012 Schur re-rode two stages of the 1955 Peace Race, as part of the Alf Buttler Peace Race Tribute Ride.

Honors 
In 2005 the planetoid 2000 UR was named after Schur. It now has the official designation (38976) Täve, circling the Sun on an orbit between Mars and Jupiter.

Books 
Adolf Klimanschewsky: Täve. Das Lebensbild eines Sportlers unserer Zeit. Sport Verlag, Berlin, 1955
Klaus Ullrich: Unser Täve. Ein Buch über Gustav Adolf Schur. Sport-Verlag, Berlin, 1959.
Klaus Ullrich: Unser Weltmeister. Sport-Verlag, Berlin, 1959
Uwe Johnson: Das dritte Buch über Achim. Suhrkamp, Frankfurt am Main, 1962.
Klaus Huhn: Das vierte Buch über Täve. Spotless-Verlag, Berlin, 1992, 
Tilo Köhler: Der Favorit fuhr Kowalit. Täve Schur und die Friedensfahrt. Kiepenheuer, Leipzig 1997, 
Klaus Huhn: Der Kandidat. Spotless-Verlag, Berlin, 1998, 
Andreas Ciesielski:: Täve. Eine Legende wurde 70. Scheunen-Verlag, Kückenshagen 2001, 
Gustav-Adolf Schur: Die Autobiographie. Das Neue Berlin Verlagsgesellschaft, Berlin, 2001, 
Klaus Ullrich, Klaus Köste: Das 9. (neunte) Buch über Schur. Spotless-Verlag, Berlin, 2002, 
Andreas Ciesielski: Typisch Täve. Scheunen-Verlag, Kückenshagen 2006, 
Gustav-Adolf Schur: Täve, die Autobiografie. Gustav Adolf Schur erzählt sein Leben. Verlag Das Neue Berlin, Berlin 2011, 
Gustav-Adolf Schur: Der Ruhm und ich. Spotless-Verlag, Berlin, 2011, 
Gustav-Adolf Schur: Täve, die Autobiografie. Gustav Adolf Schur erzählt sein Leben. 2. überarbeitete und erweiterte Auflage, Verlag Das Neue Berlin, Berlin 2011,

References

External links

1931 births
Living people
People from Jerichower Land
People from the Province of Saxony
Socialist Unity Party of Germany politicians
Party of Democratic Socialism (Germany) politicians
Members of the 3rd Volkskammer
Members of the 4th Volkskammer
Members of the 5th Volkskammer
Members of the 6th Volkskammer
Members of the 7th Volkskammer
Members of the 8th Volkskammer
Members of the 9th Volkskammer
Members of the 10th Volkskammer
Members of the Bundestag for Saxony-Anhalt
Members of the Bundestag 1998–2002
Free German Youth members
German male cyclists
East German male cyclists
Cyclists from Saxony-Anhalt
Cyclists at the 1956 Summer Olympics
Cyclists at the 1960 Summer Olympics
Olympic cyclists of the United Team of Germany
Olympic silver medalists for the United Team of Germany
Olympic bronze medalists for the United Team of Germany
Olympic medalists in cycling
Medalists at the 1956 Summer Olympics
Medalists at the 1960 Summer Olympics
Recipients of the Patriotic Order of Merit (honor clasp)
Members of the Bundestag for the Party of Democratic Socialism (Germany)
German sportsperson-politicians